Polythlipta divaricata is a moth in the family Crambidae. It was described by Frederic Moore in 1885. It is found in Sri Lanka, China, Taiwan and Papua New Guinea.

References

Spilomelinae
Moths described in 1885